Trevor Sutherland (born 4 July 1954) is a New Zealand former cricketer. He played five first-class matches for Otago between 1979 and 1980.

See also
 List of Otago representative cricketers

References

External links
 

1954 births
Living people
New Zealand cricketers
Otago cricketers
Cricketers from Dunedin